Craige B. Champion (born June 30, 1956) is an American historian and classical scholar. He has been Professor of Ancient History at Syracuse University (Maxwell School of Citizenship and Public Affairs) since 2017. His research and teaching focus on Ancient Greek and Roman History, Religion and Politics in Ancient Greece and Rome, Greek and Roman Historiography, Greek and Roman Political Thought, Ethnic Identity Formation in Greek and Roman Antiquity, Politics of Culture in Ancient Greece and Rome, Citizenship and Empire in Greek and Roman Antiquity, Polybius, and Tacitus.

Career 
Craige B. Champion was born on June 30, 1956. He earned a B.A. (summa cum laude) from the College of New Jersey (1984), and a M.A. from Princeton University (1989), then completed a Ph.D. at that institution in 1993. Champion also studied Greek and Latin at the City University of New York's Summer Latin/Greek Institute in 1984 and 1986. 
He has taught at Princeton University (1990, 1992), College of New Jersey (1991–1992), Lewis School and Diagnostic Center (1992–1993), Rutgers University (1993), Reed College (1993–1995), Allegheny College (1995–2001), and Syracuse University (since 2001). 

Champion is a recipient of the Thoburn Foundation Award (Allegheny College), the Daniel Patrick Moynihan Award (Syracuse University), and an Excellence in Teaching Award (Syracuse University and University College). From 2006-2009, he served as Chair of the History Department at Syracuse. He was also one of the original founding general editors of the award-winning Wiley-Blackwell's Encyclopedia of Ancient History, in 13 volumes (print edition published in 2013).  This reference work won Honorable Mention for Reference Works for the Dartmouth Medal (American Library Association). It is continually updated and expanded in its on-line version. He has served as editorial consultant for the Oxford University Press and the Princeton University Press. He has lectured all over the United States and in Canada, the United Kingdom, Argentina, Armenia, Greece, Hungary, Israel, Italy, Spain, France, and Russia.  In 2019-2020, Champion was a U.S. Fulbright Scholar, living, teaching, and conducting research in Moscow, Russia.

Publications and reception
Champion's first book, Cultural Politics in Polybius's Histories, was published in 2004 by the University of California Press, and looks at the life and work of the ancient Greek historian Polybius. It was reviewed by the Bryn Mawr Classical Review as a "truly original" and "invaluable" contribution. The Canadian Journal of History described Champion's book as a "remarkable achievement" and "enormous accomplishment" on Greek historiography.

In a recent work on Polybius, Daniel Walker Moore (Polybius: Experience and the Lessons of History. Leiden and Boston: Brill Publishers: 2020, pg. 6) noted: 

“Eckstein’s Moral Vision in the Histories of Polybius (1995) opened the door for a fresh wave of Polybian scholarship by showing that Polybius’ text, rather than presenting a purely might-is-right, or ‘Macchiavellian’, view of the world, in fact attempts to represent for the reader important moral lessons that are distinct from practical utility. Champion’s Cultural Politics in Polybius’s Histories (2004) followed by demonstrating the complex representation of various cultures, especially the Romans, in Polybius’ text. These fresh demonstrations of the complexity of Polybius’ work generated an explosion of interest in this historian over the next decade.” 

Champion's second book, The Peace of the Gods: Elite Religious Practices in the Middle Roman Republic, was published in 2017 by the Princeton University Press. Dan-el Padilla Peralta, a professor of Classics at Princeton University, wrote in his review of the book in the journal Histos:

"I want to conclude by stressing that Champion has written a remarkable book that will embolden future scholars to make fuller use of scientific literature. Rarely does one see publications from the Bulletin of Mathematical Biophysics tapped as aides-à-penser for the history of Roman religion. . . . [The] book’s capacity to spark disagreement is ocular proof of its overall success, and there is no doubt in my mind that The Peace of the Gods deserves to occupy a position of prominence in Roman religious studies for the foreseeable future."

In the American Historical Review, Federico Santangelo writes, "[The] discussion of ‘cognitive dissonance’ in Roman religion is the most advanced attempt to date to explore its viability in this field. . . . This book is a very substantial contribution to the understanding of pre-Augustan Roman religion—one that all students of the political and social history of the Roman world will do well not to overlook, and one that historians of other periods will find informative and inspiring in equal measure."

Champion has particular research interests in Imperialism and Empire in Ancient Greece and Rome and Democracy, Ancient and Modern. He is the editor of Roman Imperialism: Readings and Sources (Oxford: Wiley-Blackwell, 2004), a successful sourcebook which has gone through six printings (first published in 2004 and still in print). He is also the editor for the topic of Roman Imperialism, for Oxford Bibliographies On-Line.

Current projects 
Champion is currently finishing up two large projects, a new book titled Citizen and Empire in Democratic Athens, Republican Rome, and Twenty-First Century America, and a two-volume, critical edition of Polybius titled, The Landmark Edition of Polybius' Histories.

Selected works
 Cultural Politics in Polybius's Histories (2004)
 (Editor) Roman Imperialism: Readings and Sources (2004)

References 

Living people
1956 births
American classical scholars
The College of New Jersey alumni
Princeton University faculty
Syracuse University faculty
Rutgers University faculty
Reed College faculty
Allegheny College faculty